Betsy James is an American writer and illustrator of children books and books for young adults. She has been nominated for the World Fantasy Awards and the James Tiptree Jr Memorial Award.

Early life and education

She was born in Missouri, United States. She went to Mount Holyoke College as well as the University of Utah where she got a degree in English. James works as a freelance writer and illustrator. She lives in Albuquerque, New Mexico. There she works on her books and teaches.

Bibliography

Series
 What's That Room For?, (1988)
 Natalie Underneath, (1990)
 Long Night Dance, (1989)
 Dark Heart, (1992)
 Listening At the Gate, (2006)
  Roadsouls, (2016)

Collections
 Sandspurs and Sawgrass, (2000)

Picture books
 The Red Cloak, (1989)
 The Dream Stair, (1990)
 He Wakes Me, (1991)
 Mary Ann, (1994)
 The Mud Family, (1994)
 Blow Away Soon, (1995)
 Flashlight, (1997)
 Tadpoles, (1999)
 My Chair, (2004)

References

Year of birth missing (living people)
Living people
21st-century American women artists
21st-century American women writers
20th-century American women artists
20th-century American women writers
University of Utah alumni
Mount Holyoke College alumni
American science fiction writers